Shaun J. Brown (born January 19, 1987) is an American television and film actor known for his role on the TV series The Great Indoors. He was active in musical theater in high school and college at the University of Miami before doing music videos and choreography for a hip hop dance crew. He shifted to television roles in 2011 and has recently begun acting in motion pictures.

Filmography

Film
 Heart, Baby (2017) - Bug
Wilson (2017)
 Hooking Up - Franklin

Television

References

External links
 

1987 births
Living people
American male film actors
African-American male actors
American male television actors
21st-century African-American people
20th-century African-American people
University of Miami alumni